The Greek noun aphedron is a term for latrine.

The word occurs twice in the New Testament (Matthew 15:17, Mark 7:19) and was unknown in classical texts. The Vulgate rendered the term secessus, latrine. Wycliffe avoided the reference to a privy with "and beneath it goeth out," while Martin Luther translated the word as natürliche Gang ("natural course"), though Tyndale's "and goeth out into the draught" is more clear. Perhaps due in part to Luther's "natural course," various 18th and 19th Century scholars assumed it was a euphemism for the human bowel. However the discovery and publication of an inscription at Pergamon confirmed that the word does, as per Latin secessus, in fact mean latrine.

Further the Mark 7:19 verse says "out into the afedron, cleaning all meats" which makes no sense if the meat is still lodged in the lower intestine.

Inscription 
The following is a transcription and translation of the relevant text from Lex de astynomis Pergamenorum ("Law of the town clerks of Pergamon") following the Greek text as published by Klaffenbach (1954).

483.220 ΑΦΕΔΡΩΝΩΝ = Concerning privies.
ΟΙ ΑΣΤΥΝΟΜΟΙ = the town clerks ΕΠΙΜΕΛΕΙΑΝ = care (f.acc.) ΠΟΙΕΙΣΘΩΣΑΝ = shall make ΤΩΝ ΤΕ = of the ΔΗΜΟΣΙΩΝ = public ΑΦΕΔΡΩΝΩΝ = privies, ΚΑΙ ΤΩΝ = and of ΕΞ ΑΥΤΩΝ = out of them ΥΠΟΝΟΜΩΝ = sewers pl. ΚΑΙ ΕΑΝ = and if ΤΙΝΕΣ = some ΜΗ ΣΤΕΓΝΟΙ = not covers/lids pl. ΥΠΑΡΧΩΣΙΝ = already in existence ΚΑΙ ΤΩΝ.... = and of.... (text broken)

Translation: Concerning WCs. The town clerks shall maintain the public WCs and their outpipes. And if some of them are not covered and of them... (text broken).

References 

New Testament Greek words and phrases